Henry Langton Brackenbury (26 April 1868 – 28 April 1920) was a British Conservative Party politician who served for two short  periods as Member of Parliament (MP) for Louth in Lincolnshire.

He was first elected at the general election in January 1910, but was defeated at the December 1910 general election by the Liberal candidate Timothy Davies. He regained the seat at the 1918 general election, but died in office in 1920, aged 52.

The by-election after his death, was won by the Liberal candidate Thomas Wintringham.

References

External links 
 

1868 births
1920 deaths
Conservative Party (UK) MPs for English constituencies
UK MPs 1910
UK MPs 1918–1922